Hochzeitssuppe (literally: "wedding soup") is a clear German soup based on chicken broth, fortified with chicken meat, small meatballs, asparagus heads, noodles and savoury egg custard garnish. Sometimes raisins are added as well.

 is eaten in Northern Germany and Southern Germany by the bride and groom and guests, traditionally after the wedding ceremony, and it is usually served as the starter on the menu at the wedding reception.

This also forms the entree on wedding menus, followed by the cold meat from which the broth had been prepared, served with remoulade, silverskin onions and pickled gherkins as a second course.

At retail outlets there are also varieties of instant soups that go by this name.

See also
 Wedding soup
 Ciorbă de perişoare
 Smyrna meatballs
 List of German soups
 List of soups
 Yuvarlak
 Tabriz meatballs
 Analı kızlı soup
 Sulu köfte

References

German soups
Wedding food
Marriage in Germany